The Euler D.II was a German single-seat fighter, the successor to the earlier Euler D.I. The D.II was essentially a re-engined Euler D.I, the air-frame being virtually unchanged and the power plant being a 100 hp Oberusel U I 9-cylinder rotary.

Operational history
30 D.II fighters were ordered by the German air force in March 1917, however due to slow production these were not delivered until December 1917. As a result, the D.II was relegated to the role of a trainer aircraft for the rest of the war.

Operators

Luftstreitkräfte

Specifications

References

Further reading
 William Green and  Gordon Swanborough. The Complete Book of Fighters.  Colour Library Direct, Godalming, UK: 1994. .

1910s German fighter aircraft
Sesquiplanes
Rotary-engined aircraft
Aircraft first flown in 1917